"24 Hours" is a song by American rapper A Boogie wit da Hoodie featuring fellow American rapper Lil Durk. It was released as the second single from A Boogie's fourth EP B4 AVA, on May 21, 2021. The song was produced by Rogét Chahayed, S. Dot, Band on the Beat, and Chuck Taylor.

Background and composition
On "24 Hours", A Boogie wit da Hoodie and Lil Durk both "serenade their better halves in a way only these crooners could". The two artists croon about seeing their respective significant others for twenty-four hours a day, seven days a week (forever) on the "melodic" song. The "somber and somewhat sad" song discusses the "ups and downs" of a relationship and how the couples stay down with one another and get through it. A Boogie announced the release of the single on May 18, 2021. He shared a snippet the following day, May 19, 2021.

Charts

Certifications

References

2021 singles
2021 songs
A Boogie wit da Hoodie songs
Songs written by A Boogie wit da Hoodie
Lil Durk songs
Songs written by Lil Durk
Songs written by Rogét Chahayed

Pop-rap songs